Galilei ja kadonneet lelut (Galilei and the Missing Toys) is a 1997 Finnish video game based on the  that aired on Yle TV2. The franchise's main character, Galilei, is created by the writer and animator . A sequel for the game, was released in 2000.

References

1997 video games
Windows games
Windows-only games
Video games developed in Finland
Finland-exclusive video games
Video games based on animated television series
Works based on Finnish works

Single-player video games